Sumona Chakravarti (born 24 June 1988) is an Indian film and television actress. She is well known for her roles in Bade Achhe Lagte Hain, Comedy Nights With Kapil and The Kapil Sharma Show.

Career 
She began her acting career at the age of 11 through Aamir Khan and Manisha Koirala starrer Mann in the year 1999. In the next few years she did quite a few television shows but her big breakthrough happened in 2011 when she played the role of Natasha in Bade Achhe Lagte Hain, a television show produced by Balaji Telefilms.

In the following year she participated in the comedy show Kahani Comedy Circus Ki on Sony TV with Kapil Sharma and the duo emerged as the winners of the show. From there on began her professional partnership with Kapil Sharma that is still going on. From June 2013 to January 2016 she was seen as Manju Sharma in Comedy Nights with Kapil where she played the role of Kapil Sharma's wife. In 2016, she came back to the screen with Sony TV's The Kapil Sharma Show which she was seen playing the role of Sarla Gulati, a girl deeply in love with her neighbour Kapil. The show came back with its second season in 2018 where she is playing the role of Bhuri.

In between all this Sumona Chakravarti has also done two travel shows namely Dubai Diaries and Swiss Made Advetures both on NDTV Good Times. While she was the host in Dubai Diaries, she went in as a participant seeking the adventurous side of Switzerland in Swiss Made Adventures.

Filmography

Television

Theatre

Awards and nominations

Indian Telly Awards

Indian Television Academy Awards

Yash Bharti Award

Sumona Chakravarti was awarded with the Yash Bharti Award  on 27 October 2016 by the Government of Uttar Pradesh.

Boroplus Gold Awards

See also
 List of Indian television actresses

References

External links

Living people
1997 births
Actresses from Lucknow
Bengali Hindus
Actresses in Hindi cinema
Indian film actresses
Indian television actresses
21st-century Indian actresses